Ana Radović may refer to:
 Ana Radović (handballer) (born 1986), Montenegrin women's handball player
 Ana Radović (basketball, born 1990), Serbian women's basketball player
 Ana Radović (basketball, born 1997), Bosnian women's basketball player